Camille Anne Françoise Abily (born 5 December 1984) is a French football manager and former player, best known as a star midfielder for both the French women's national team and for the Lyon club in the Division 1 Féminine. She currently is the assistant manager of Olympique Lyonnais.

As a player, Abily played primarily as an attacking midfielder. She was a two-time winner of the National Union of Professional Footballers (UNFP) Female Player of the Year and, following her second consecutive honour in 2007, became the first woman to win the award in back-to-back seasons. Following a move to the Women's Professional Soccer (WPS) league in the United States, she earned Player of the Month and All-Star honors.

Abily began her football career joining Jeanne d'Arc Bruz in 1992. In 1994, she joined nearby club FC Bruz. After a year's stint at another local club, Abily spent time in the first division playing for Stade Briochin and La Roche-sur-Yon. In 2002, she was selected to attend the women's section of the nationally recognized Clairefontaine academy. After her stint at Clairefontaine, Abily signed with Montpellier and won two league titles while at the club, as well as the Challenge de France, the women's domestic cup. After three seasons with Montpellier, Abily joined Lyon. Similar to her stint at Montpellier, she won several titles, which included three straight league titles from 2006–2009. In 2008, Abily joined the new United States-based women's soccer league, Women's Professional Soccer, after her American playing rights were chosen by the Los Angeles Sol in the 2008 WPS International Draft. After helping the Sol win the league, Abily returned to France where she played for Paris Saint-Germain on loan. In 2010, she returned to the United States to play with FC Gold Pride and, subsequently, won her second consecutive title in the league. In 2010, Abily announced that she would be returning to Lyon for the 2010–11 season and, subsequently, was a part of the team that won the 2010–11 UEFA Women's Champions League.

Abily also earned 183 caps as a French international. Prior to playing for the senior team, she played at youth level representing the under-18 team at the 2001 UEFA Women's Under-18 Championship. Abily made her senior international debut in September 2001, in a friendly match against the Netherlands. She scored her first goal for the national team six years later in a 2–0 win over China in February 2007. Abily made her major international tournament debut for the team at UEFA Women's Euro 2005 and later played on the teams that qualified for UEFA Women's Euro 2009, UEFA Women's Euro 2013 as well as the FIFA Women's World Cup in 2011 and 2015.

Club career
Abily has won the league with her respective club on four occasions. She won two titles with Montpellier and back-to-back titles with Lyon. During two of those title runs, she was selected as the Female Player of the Year in 2006 and 2007. In 2010, she won the WPS Championship with the FC Gold Pride.

In March 2009, she joined the new United States-based women's soccer league, Women's Professional Soccer, after her American playing rights were assigned to the Los Angeles Sol. She made her debut in the league's inaugural match against the Washington Freedom, which included her French compatriot Sonia Bompastor, and scored the second goal in the Sol's 2–0 victory. On 7 January 2010 Abily was traded to FC Gold Pride. She played in 17 games, scoring one goal and having six assists. On 27 September, Abily's contract with the Gold Pride was mutually terminated as she decided to return to Olympique Lyon and focus on the upcoming 2011 FIFA Women's World Cup.

After spending 8 seasons at Lyon during her second stint as a player there, Abily ended her playing career in 2018.

International career
Abily made her international debut for Les Bleues on 26 September 2001 in a match against the Netherlands.

At the opening match of the 2015 FIFA Women's World Cup, a 1–0 win over England in Moncton, Abily controversially escaped punishment when she inflicted a black eye on Laura Bassett by elbowing the English player in the face.

She competed for France at the 2012 Summer Olympics and the 2016 Summer Olympics.

Abily retired from international football in 2017, citing a desire to spend more time with her daughter.

Managerial career
As of fall 2019, Abily is working as an assistant coach for the Olympique Lyonnais women's club.

Career statistics

Club

Statistics accurate as of 1 September 2016

International

(Correct as of 1 September 2016)

International goals

Honours

Club
Montpellier HSC
 Division 1 Féminine: 2004, 2005
 Coupe de France Féminine: 2006
FC Gold Pride
 WPS Championship: 2010
Lyon
 Division 1 Féminine: 2007, 2008, 2009, 2011, 2012, 2013, 2014, 2015, 2016, 2017
 Coupe de France Féminine: 2008, 2012, 2013, 2014, 2015, 2016, 2017
 UEFA Women's Champions League: 2011, 2012, 2016, 2017, 2018

International
France
Cyprus Cup: 2012, 2014
SheBelieves Cup: 2017

Individual
 UNFP Female Player of the Year:  2005–06, 2006–07
 WPS Player of the Month: June 2009
 WPS All-Star: 2009

References

External links

 
 
 
  
 
 
 

1984 births
Living people
French expatriate sportspeople in the United States
French women's footballers
France women's international footballers
Los Angeles Sol players
Footballers from Rennes
Montpellier HSC (women) players
CNFE Clairefontaine players
Paris Saint-Germain Féminine players
Olympique Lyonnais Féminin players
2011 FIFA Women's World Cup players
2015 FIFA Women's World Cup players
Footballers at the 2012 Summer Olympics
Footballers at the 2016 Summer Olympics
Olympic footballers of France
FIFA Century Club
Women's association football midfielders
Division 1 Féminine players
Women's Professional Soccer players
UEFA Women's Euro 2017 players
French expatriate women's footballers
Expatriate women's soccer players in the United States